ESSA-9, also known as TOS-G, was a meteorological satellite. Its name was derived from that of its oversight agency, the Environmental Science Services Administration (ESSA). ESSA-9 replaced the ESSA-7 satellite.

Launch and orbit
ESSA-9 was launched on a three-stage Delta rocket from Cape Canaveral, Florida. The launch occurred at 07:47 UTC (02:47 EDT) on February 26, 1969. The spacecraft was placed in a sun-synchronous orbit of 101.4° inclination. ESSA-9 operated for 1,726 days before it was deactivated in November 1972.

Spacecraft
The body of ESSA-9 was made of aluminum alloy and stainless steel. The shell of the craft was covered with 10,020 solar cells. The solar cells recharged the 63 nickel–cadmium batteries during the time the spacecraft was in sunlight. ESSA-9 employed the same cartwheel-style stabilization as the TIROS-9 satellite. The satellite used a magnetic attitude spin coil (MASC) to control its attitude while in orbit. The magnetic field induced by the MASC's current interacted with the earth's magnetic field to provide the torque necessary to maintain a desired spin rate of 9.225 rpm.

Instruments
ESSA-9 carried two sets of two main instruments, the Advanced Vidicon Camera System (AVCS) and the Flat Plate Radiometer (FPR). The AVCS was used to collect imagery of cloud cover on earth. The cameras took single images of a particular region of the earth's surface once a day. The FPR's were used to measure the global distribution of solar radiation reflected by the earth and the earth's atmosphere. They also measured long-wave emissions from the earth. The sensors used in the ESSA satellites were from the earlier Nimbus program.

References

External links
 NSSDC ID: 1969-016A

Spacecraft launched in 1969
Weather satellites of the United States